The 1971 Wyoming Cowboys football team represented the University of Wyoming as a member of the Western Athletic Conference (WAC) during the 1971 NCAA University Division football season. Led by first-year head coach Fritz Shurmur, the Cowboys compiled a record of 5–6 overall and 3–4 in conference play, placing in a three-way tie for third in the WAC. The team played home games on campus at War Memorial Stadium in Laramie, Wyoming.

Shurmur had been the defensive line coach at Wyoming for nine years under head coach Lloyd Eaton, who resigned in December 1970. Shurmur was reassigned to assistant athletic director, and Shurmur was promoted to head coach.

Schedule

NFL Draft
One Cowboy was selected in the 1972 NFL Draft, which lasted seventeen rounds (442 selections).

List of Wyoming Cowboys in the NFL Draft

References

External links
 Sports Reference – 1971 season – Wyoming Cowboys

Wyoming
Wyoming Cowboys football seasons
Wyoming Cowboys football